Radio Parade is a 1933 British musical comedy film directed by Richard Beville and Archie de Bear and featuring an ensemble cast including Florence Desmond, Claude Hulbert, Jeanne De Casalis and the comedy double act Clapham and Dwyer. A revue film, it was made by British International Pictures who had produced a similarly formatted film Elstree Calling in 1930. It contained many of the leading radio stars of the era. A further revue film Radio Parade of 1935 also followed.

Cast
 Doris Arnold as Self - pianist
 Elsie Carlisle as 	Self
 Charles Clapham as 	Self 
 Mabel Constanduros as 	Grandma Buggins
 Carlyle Cousins as 	Themselves
 Jeanne De Casalis as 	Mrs. Feather
 Florence Desmond as 	Self
 Bill Dwyer as 	Self 
 Roy Fox as 	Roy Fox and his band
 Reginald Gardiner as 	Self
 Leonard Henry as 	Self
 Billie Houston as 	Self 
 Renee Houston as 	Self 
 Claude Hulbert as 	Self
 Mario 'Harp' Lorenzi as Self
 B.C. Hilliam as Self 
 Malcolm 'Mr. Jetsam' McEachern as	Self 
 Tex McLeod as Self
 Gus McNaughton as 	Self
 Harry S. Pepper as 	Self - pianist
 Stanelli as Self
 Stainless Stephen as	Self
 Christopher Stone as 	Self - disc jockey
 Doris Waters as 	Daisy
 Elsie Waters as 	Gert
 Keith Wilbur as 	Self
 Hal Gordon as Garage Mechanic 
 Eric Pavitt as Boy 
 Ernest Sefton as 	Nightclub Compere

References

Bibliography
 Low, Rachael. Filmmaking in 1930s Britain. George Allen & Unwin, 1985.
 Street, Seán. The A to Z of British Radio. Scarecrow Press, 2009.
 Wood, Linda. British Films, 1927-1939. British Film Institute, 1986.
 Wright, Adrian. Cheer Up!: British Musical Films 1929-1945. The Boydell Press, 2020.

External links

1933 films
British comedy films
British black-and-white films
1933 comedy films
Films shot at British International Pictures Studios
1930s English-language films
1930s British films